Karen Azoulay (born 1977) is a multidisciplinary visual and performance artist from Toronto, Canada. She is currently based in Brooklyn, New York.

Artistic practice 
Azoulay’s artwork includes colourful sculpture, performance and installations. Her interdisciplinary works, which explore language, natural elements, and the female form, are often captured in film or photography finished with collage or paint. She uses ephemeral materials such as fresh flowers, clay, and her own body. In her exhibition Semi-Precious (2019) at Essex Flowers, Azoulay drew inspiration from a skeleton of an 11th-century German woman, who was found to have remnants of lapis lazuli on her teeth, indicating she was likely a manuscript illuminator. Azoulay's "Eating Flowers" motif, in which she consumes different flowers with dark, glitter-coated lips and teeth, explores ideas of vulnerability, nourishment, and decay.

Solo exhibitions 
Solo exhibitions include CUE Art Foundation in New York, curated by Glenn Ligon, Fire Tale, Four Gallery in Dublin, Deep, Deep Under the Sea, Mercer Union in Toronto, Sculpture After the Apocalypse, Primetime, Brooklyn, The Botanist’s Mime, Dose Projects, Brooklyn, and Indexing the Leaves, Methodist Archives, Drew University in Madison, NJ.

Publications 
In 2015, Azoulay self-published a booklet titled Flowers and their Meanings, which includes her photography and a dictionary of Victorian flower symbolism. Azoulay will expand her study of floriography, the Victorian language of flowers, in her upcoming book Flowers and their Meanings, which will be released by Clarkson Potter (an imprint of Penguin Random House) in 2022.

References 

1977 births
21st-century Canadian artists
Canadian performance artists
Women performance artists
Living people
Artists from Toronto